Lugny-lès-Charolles (literally Lugny near Charolles) is a commune in the Saône-et-Loire department in the region of Bourgogne-Franche-Comté in eastern France.

Geography
The Arconce forms part of the commune's eastern border, flows southwest through the middle of the commune, then forms part of its southwestern border.

See also
Communes of the Saône-et-Loire department

References

Communes of Saône-et-Loire